An Armenian cross is a symbol that combines a cross with a floral postament or elements. In the Armenian Christianity it was combined with the Christian cross and this design was often used for high crosses (khachkar) – a free-standing cross made of stone and often richly decorated.

Pre-Christian connections
The Armenologist James R. Russell notes that the Armenian Cross incorporates influences from Armenia's Zoroastrian past. As Zoroastrian traditions were very much integrated into Armenian spirital and material culture, they survived the zealotry of the Sasanian priest Kartir and his successors, and were ultimately incorporated into Armenian Christianity. Russell adds: "The Armenian Cross itself is supported on tongues of flame and has at its center not the body of Christ, but a sunburst".

Gallery

See also 

 Celtic knot
 High cross
 Khachkar

References

Bibliography

External links 
 Khatchkar collection at Armenica.org
 Old Jugha page on Armeniapedia
 Destruction of Jugha khachkars by Azeri soldiers captured in photos and movie clips.
 Khachkar page on Armeniapedia (many photos)
 Photos at Armenia Photos.info 
 Photos of 15th/16th CE khatchkars near Bitlis, Turkey
 Khachkar.am :: Everything about khachkars
 Triumph of Tolerance or Vandalism? 
 Photos and history of Khachkars
 Djulfa Virtual Memorial and Museum
 Photos of Exceptional Samples of Armenian Cross-Stones (Khachkars)

Christian art
Armenian art
Christian crosses
Crosses by culture
High crosses
National symbols of Armenia